Bluegrass Unlimited is a monthly music magazine "dedicated to the furtherance of bluegrass and old-time musicians, devotees and associates." First published in 1966, as of 2008 the magazine had a circulation of more than 25,000 copies and is widely considered the premier magazine for bluegrass music.  Bluegrass Unlimited is a founding member of the International Bluegrass Music Association (IBMA).

Folklorist and music scholar Neil V. Rosenberg, in Bluegrass: A History, sets out the history of Bluegrass Unlimited  and thereafter notes its prominence and influence as the oldest of the nationally distributed bluegrass magazines. In the fall of 1970, the magazine moved from an informal to a full-time operation with "new publishers" Pete and Marion Kuykendall upgrading it to a larger, standard format on glossy paper. The current U.S. subscription rate is $25.00 per year and the magazine is full-color and printed on high-speed web offset presses. 

As music historian Bill C. Malone observed, Bluegrass Unlimited magazine was initially devoted primarily to bluegrass music in the USA and abroad with occasional reference to old time country music.  It is now a treasure trove of information on every phase of bluegrass and old-time music - biographical articles, discographies, record and book reviews, concert and festival dates, interviews, classified ads, and songs.  "Bluegrass Unlimited has always been a thorough compendium of material on bluegrass and old-time music."

Speaking of founder Pete Kuykendall and the influence of Bluegrass Unlimited, David Freeman, owner of Rebel Records and County Records, said: "When the magazine started publishing, bluegrass was pretty much at a low point. The magazine spread the word and highlighted the artistic aspect of the music, which helped to bring it out of the bars where it was in the 1950s.  Without him I don’t know where the bluegrass industry would be today."

The 1996 International Bluegrass Music Hall of Fame citation inducting Pete Kuykendall says that Bluegrass Unlimited magazine is "a publication affectionately referred to as the 'bible of bluegrass music'".

References

Sources 
Rosenberg, Neil V.  Bluegrass: A History "Music in American Life" series.  University of Illinois Press (1993). . 447 pp.

External links 
 

Monthly magazines published in the United States
Music magazines published in the United States
Bluegrass music
Magazines established in 1966
Magazines of the Southern United States
Old-time music
Magazines published in Virginia